Lulu femme nue (festival title: Lulu in the Nude) is a 2013 French comedy-drama film directed by Sólveig Anspach and based on the comic book Lulu femme nue by Etienne Davodeau.

Cast 
 Karin Viard as Lulu 
 Bouli Lanners as Charles 
 Claude Gensac as Marthe  
 Pascal Demolon as Richard  
 Philippe Rebbot as Jean-Marie 
 Marie Payen as Cécile
 Solene Rigot as Morgane
 Nina Meurisse as Virginie
 Corinne Masiero as The café owner

Accolades 
In January 2015, the film received a nomination for Best Actress at the 20th Lumières Awards and a Best Actor nomination at the 5th Magritte Awards.

References

External links 
 

2013 films
2013 comedy-drama films
2010s French-language films
French comedy-drama films
Films based on French comics
Films directed by Sólveig Anspach
Films featuring a Best Actress Lumières Award-winning performance
Live-action films based on comics
2010s French films